InterMoor is a global mooring, foundations, and subsea services company. Its services include rig moves, mooring and offshore operations such as engineering and design, survey and positioning, fabrication, subsea installation and chain inspections.

InterMoor has offices in the United States, West Africa, Brazil, South East Asia, Norway, Mexico and United Kingdom.

History

In November 2004, Acteon acquired the business and assets of Technip Offshore Moorings, Inc.  The company was renamed InterMoor Inc. and later merged with sister Acteon companies International Mooring Systems and Trident Offshore.

In 2006, InterMoor created the subsidiary InterMoor do Brasil and opened an office in Brazil.

In June 2010, Acteon acquired IOS Offshore, which became the Norwegian arm of InterMoor. Formed in 1986 with an office and workshop on NorSea’s Dusavik base in Stavanger, IOS began as a mooring equipment supply company to the offshore oil industry.

InterMoor opened its Morgan City facility in Louisiana, USA, on March 24, 2011.

The Morgan City facility received ISO14001 certification in March 2012.

InterMoor currently operates around the world from offices in the USA, Singapore, Malaysia, Brazil, Angola, Norway, Mexico and the UK.

InterMoor operates shore base services from Fourchon, Louisiana, USA and plans to offer similar shore base operations from the Açu Superport in Brazil by 2013.

InterMoor has been the current world record depth holder for a conventional drilling rig mooring installation at a water depth of 2570m since 2010.

Activities
Short for "International Moorings," InterMoor has provided temporary and permanent moorings to the offshore oil and gas industry since its founding.

InterMoor was among the first to utilize polyester fiber mooring ropes in an offshore mooring system with the Red Hawk Cell-Spar Mooring installed in 2003 for Kerr McGee.  InterMoor recently became the first company to decommission a permanent floating structure in the US Gulf of Mexico when they removed from service the Red Hawk Cell-Spar and artificially reefed it as part of the rigs to reefs program.,  InterMoor is involved in the commissioning and installation phases of moorings and risers, and the abandonment and decommissioning efforts as well.

InterMoor pioneered the design of suction piles for use as a deepwater anchors in the 1990s, and has been a part of the design, fabrication, or installation of well over 75 suction piles in the global offshore oil and gas market.,  In addition to their suction pile work, the company has also produced driven conductors and foundation piles in smaller diameters as well.

References

External links 

 
 http://www.acteon.com/acteon-companies/intermoor-8 
 https://www.rigzone.com/search/company.asp?c_id=510
 http://www.subsea.org/company/listdetails.asp?companyid=2743
 http://www.offshorenorway.no/event/companyDetail/id/3316

Companies based in Houston